The Best of Fuel is a compilation album by American hard rock band Fuel. It contains songs from their first three full-length albums, Sunburn, Something Like Human, and Natural Selection. All of the said albums featured vocalist Brett Scallions who departed from the group only a few months after the compilation's release. The Best of Fuel consists solely of the band's released singles, with the exception of "Million Miles" from Natural Selection (it features "Quarter" from the same album instead).

Track listing
All songs written by Carl Bell.

Reception

References 

Fuel (band) albums
2005 greatest hits albums
Epic Records compilation albums